Uefa 2010 may refer to

2010 FIFA World Cup qualification (UEFA)
2009–10 UEFA Champions League
2010–11 UEFA Champions League
2009–10 UEFA Europa League
2010–11 UEFA Europa League